Norsk Militært Tidsskrift is a Norwegian journal first issued in 1831, and published by Oslo Militære Samfund from 1835. The original title of the periodical was Militairt Tidsskrift. It has been issued continuously since 1831, and is among the oldest journals published in Norway.

References

Norwegian-language journals
Military journals
Publications established in 1831
1831 establishments in Norway
Academic journals published by learned and professional societies